The 2018 IAAF Continental Cup is an international track and field sporting event that was held in Ostrava, Czech Republic, on 8–9 September 2018.

It is the third edition of the IAAF Continental Cup since the name and format was changed from the IAAF World Cup.

Format
The four teams competing in the event were Africa, the Americas, Asia-Pacific and Europe. The two-day competition comprised a programme of 20 track and field events for men and women, giving a total of 40 events. Each team shall enter two athletes in each event, except for relays where one team competed, with a maximum of one athlete from each country per event.

Teams were selected as follows:
 Africa: 2018 African Championships (Asaba, 1–5 August)
 Americas: selection by rankings
 Asia-Pacific: selection by rankings
 Europe: 2018 European Championships (Berlin, 7–12 August)

Many events were conducted in elimination fashion.  Field events were given three attempts to qualify to a semi-final round, where the best representative from each continental team was given one more attempt.  The top two then had one more attempt for the championship, head to head.  The 3000 metre and steeplechase running events were conducted in a "devil take the hindmost" fashion, where the last place runner in the last three laps of the race, was eliminated.  Additionally, the ceremonial team captains were allowed to apply a "joker" to one male and female event through the competition.  If the team won the individual points from the event, that team's score would be doubled.

Team captains:
Africa:  Nezha Bidouane
Americas:  Mike Powell
Asia Pacific:  Jana Pittman
Europe:  Colin Jackson

Scoring was based on team points earned in an 8-6-4-2 fashion based on the places of individual points.  The individual points were distributed 8-7-6-5-4-3-2-1 based on the places of finishing athletes.  After those points were tallied, then team points were calculated.  Ties divide points based on the total of both places.  Example:  If team A fished 1st and 5th they would get 8 + 4 = 12 points.  Team B finished 2nd and 3rd would get 7 + 6 = 13 and would win that event.  So Team B would get 8 team points, Team A, 6 points.  If Team B were to have played their Joker, they would get 16 points.  Had Team A's athlete finished in 4th, it would be a tie with 13 individual points each and the team points would be (8 + 6 / 2) 7 each, and with the Joker, Team B would get 14.

Athletes were encouraged to be fan friendly.  As a result many played to the crowd.

Schedule

Standings

Medal summary

Men

Women

Mixed

Participating nations

Africa
 (1)
 (1)
 (3)
 (2)
 (2)
 (1)
 (4)
 (3)
 (1)
 (1)
 (9)
 (6)
 (15)
 (20)
 (1)
 (2)
 (1)

Americas
 (1)
 (2)
 (4)
 (1)
 (5)
 (2)
 (3)
 (1)
 (2)
 (1)
 (12)
 (1)
 (1)
 (2)
 (1)
 (1)
 (29)
 (1)

Asia-Pacific
 (27)
 (8)
 (15)
 (7)
 (6)
 (2)
 (1)
 (4)
 (1)
 (1)
 (1)
 (1)
 (1)
 (1)
 (1)

Europe
 (5)
 (2)
 (1)
 (2)
 (1)
 (4)
 (1)
 (5)
 (8)
 (9)
 (3)
 (1)
 (1)
 (1)
 (4)
 (3)
 (9)
 (1)
 (2)
 (2)
 (7)
 (3)

References

External links
 2018 IAAF Continental Cup Homepage

IAAF Continental Cup
IAAF Continental Cup
Continental Cup
IAAF Continental Cup
International athletics competitions hosted by the Czech Republic
IAAF Continental Cup
Sport in Ostrava